Soufiyan Bouqantar (also spelled Soufiane, born 30 August 1993) is a Moroccan long-distance runner.  At the 2012 Summer Olympics, he competed in the Men's 5000 metres, finishing 32nd overall in Round 1, failing to qualify for the final.  At the 2013 Mediterranean Games, Bouqanter won a bronze medal in the Men's 10000 metres.

At the 2020 Summer Olympics, he competed in the men's 5,000 metres event.

References

External links

 
 
 

 

Moroccan male long-distance runners
Living people
Olympic athletes of Morocco
Athletes (track and field) at the 2012 Summer Olympics
Athletes (track and field) at the 2016 Summer Olympics
1993 births
World Athletics Championships athletes for Morocco
Mediterranean Games gold medalists in athletics
Mediterranean Games bronze medalists for Morocco
Athletes (track and field) at the 2013 Mediterranean Games
Mediterranean Games medalists in athletics
Athletes (track and field) at the 2019 African Games
African Games competitors for Morocco
Athletes (track and field) at the 2020 Summer Olympics
Athletes (track and field) at the 2022 Mediterranean Games